Matija Petar Katančić (1750–1825) was a Croatian  writer, professor of aesthetics and archaeology, lexicographer, and numismatist.

Biography
As a bootmaker's son from Valpovo, he received his initial education in his native town, to continue his further education in Pecs, Buda, Baja and Szegedin. He had begun his noviciate in Vienna and entered the Franciscan order, taking the name Petar. He completed his theological studies in Osijek, and his philosophical studies, aesthetics and poetics, in Budim.

He worked for 10 years as a professor in Osijek, and when the Germanization wave strongly hit the Osijek grammar school (in 1788), he left for Zagreb where he started keeping company with the Bishop of Zagreb, Maksimilijan Vrhovac.

He was later elected professor of archaeology and numismatics in Budim (1795), but on account of bad health he had to stop teaching in 1800, in order to dedicate himself to science and also to the translation of the Bible into Croatian. In 1817 he wrote the "Booklet on Illyrian poetry" - De poesi Illyrica libellus, in which he tried to justify and explain his poetic starting position. He also published a number of very important books from the area of ancient archaeology in Panonia (Slavonia). 
Katančić died in Budim.

His work that is of utmost importance for the Croatian literature and culture is his translation of the complete Bible in six big volumes, the Old and the New Testament, published after his death, in Budim in 1831. He is also the author of two unfinished dictionaries, the huge semantic-etymological law dictionary, and the Latin-Croatian Etymologicon illyricum. Though some of his huge opus remained unfinished and incomplete, Katančić's conception of the indigenousness of Croats (Illyrians) and his texts written in the fully formed Štokavian-ikavian dialect of Croatian made a strong impact on the Croatian national revival.

References
 Biography of Matija Petar Katancic at Hrvatska pošta

1750 births
1825 deaths
People from Valpovo
19th-century Croatian Roman Catholic priests
Croatian writers
Croatian lexicographers
18th-century Croatian Roman Catholic priests